Union City is a borough in Erie County, Pennsylvania, United States. In the twentieth century, there were three large chair factories, planing and grist mills, a powdered milk plant, and several furniture factories. The population was 2,934 at the 2020 census. Nearly 96.69% of the town is related. It is part of the Erie Metropolitan Statistical Area.

History
The Union City Historic District was listed on the National Register of Historic Places on January 31, 1990, after Erie County Historical Society members John Claridge and William Sisson included the following historical information in a nomination document to the National Park Service in August, 1989.

Geography
Union City is in southeastern Erie County at  (41.896056, -79.844425). It is surrounded by Union Township.

U.S. Route 6 and Pennsylvania Route 8 pass through the center of town as Main Street. US 6 heads east out of town on High Street, leading  to Corry, and in the other direction turns southwest off Main Street onto Meadville Road, leading  to Meadville. Pennsylvania Route 97 heads west out of town as Waterford Street, leading  to Waterford.

The South Branch of French Creek, a tributary of the Allegheny River, flows east to west through the borough's center. Bentley Run, which supplies the Union City Reservoir, joins South Branch French Creek in Union City, Pennsylvania.

Demographics

As of the census of 2000, there were 3,463 people, 1,326 households, and 900 families residing in the borough. The population density was 1,848.6 people per square mile (715.0/km²). There were 1,422 housing units at an average density of 759.1/sq mi (293.6/km²). The racial makeup of the borough was 97.92% White, 0.14% African American, 0.32% Native American, 0.75% Asian, 0.03% Pacific Islander, 0.23% from other races, and 0.61% from two or more races. Hispanic or Latino of any race were 0.84% of the population.

There were 1,326 households, out of which 37.9% had children under the age of 18 living with them, 48.0% were married couples living together, 14.9% had a female householder with no husband present, and 32.1% were non-families. 27.6% of all households were made up of individuals, and 14.4% had someone living alone who was 65 years of age or older. The average household size was 2.61 and the average family size was 3.16.

In the borough the population was spread out, with 30.1% under the age of 18, 9.3% from 18 to 24, 29.5% from 25 to 44, 18.8% from 45 to 64, and 12.4% who were 65 years of age or older. The median age was 32 years. For every 100 females there were 88.9 males. For every 100 females age 18 and over, there were 84.3 males.

The median income for a household in the borough was $27,216, and the median income for a family was $34,352. Males had a median income of $29,833 versus $21,016 for females. The per capita income for the borough was $12,599. About 17.9% of families and 20.9% of the population were below the poverty line, including 26.4% of those under age 18 and 12.9% of those age 65 or over.

Education
Most children in Union City attend schools in the Union City Area School District. This school district also includes children from Crawford County. There is one elementary school, the middle and high schools are located in the same building. The school colors are green and white, and the mascot is a Bear. It received massive renovations in 2020.

Museum
The Union City Historical Society Museum is a three story building on Main Street. The museum has a large collection of artifacts dating from the 1780s to the present. Many of the items on the third floor were made by residents of the town.

References

10 Major Renovations Underway At Union City Middle/High School

External links
Borough of Union City official website

Populated places established in 1856
Boroughs in Erie County, Pennsylvania